The U.S. Women's Amateur Four-Ball is a women's amateur team golf tournament conducted by the United States Golf Association (USGA). It was first played in 2015 and replaced the U.S. Women's Amateur Public Links, an individual tournament that was played from 1977 to 2014.

The U.S. Women's Amateur Four-Ball is played by teams of two golfers each with a handicap of 14.4 or less. 64 teams compete in a 36-hole stroke play qualifier that determines the field of 32 teams for match play. Play is conducted using a four-ball format.

The men's counterpart is the U.S. Amateur Four-Ball, also started in 2015.

Winners

Future sites
2023 The Home Course, DuPont, Washington
2024 Oak Hills Country Club, San Antonio, Texas
2025 Oklahoma City Golf & Country Club, Nichols Hills, Oklahoma
2026 Daniel Island Club, Charleston, South Carolina
2029 Desert Mountain Club, Scottsdale, Arizona
2037 Bandon Dunes Golf Resort, Bandon, Oregon

Source

References

External links

Team golf tournaments
Women's golf tournaments in the United States
Women's Amateur Four-Ball
Amateur golf tournaments in the United States